Patricia "Boots" Mallory (October 22, 1913 – December 1, 1958) was an American film actress, dancer, and model.

Career
Mallory grew up in Mobile, Alabama, where her father operated a tugboat. She attended Murphy High School, and was working in the Lyric Theater as an usherette when the Ziegfeld Follies came to Mobile.  Ziegfeld offered her a spot in his show.  She eventually travelled to New York City where she made a strong impression in the Broadway production of the Ziegfeld Follies of 1931. She became a model for the Walter Thornton Modeling Agency in New York. 

Moving to Hollywood, she found employment with Fox Films and was cast in the film version of Dawn Powell's play Walking Down Broadway. This was the first sound film by Erich von Stroheim. He shared both screenwriting and directing credits and regarded Mallory as his discovery. The play told the story of a young unmarried woman involved in a love triangle who becomes pregnant. The finished film, however, strongly suggested a lesbian relationship between Mallory's character and the character played by ZaSu Pitts. Other sexual themes involving the character played by James Dunn were considered too daring. Fox executives  brought in director Alfred L. Werker to drastically cut Von Stroheim's version and to shoot additional scenes. The film was finally released under the new title Hello, Sister! (1933) with little promotion and was not a success. Von Stroheim's original version was neither copyrighted nor released, and is considered lost.

In 1932 her second completed film, Handle with Care, also co-starring James Dunn, was released and marked her debut. It was well received and Mallory was chosen as one of the WAMPAS Baby Stars of 1932, but the extensive media publicity surrounding her WAMPAS recognition, was undermined by the poor reception given to Hello, Sister! when it was finally released.

A tall blonde, Mallory was well regarded for her striking looks and was photographed by such photographers as George Hurrell. She also posed for risque lingerie photographs, and was painted nude by the pin-up artist Rolf Armstrong.

She married James Cagney's lookalike brother William Cagney, an actor who later became a film producer for his brother.

Over the next few years, Mallory played the lead in several "B" pictures, including the Rin Tin Tin serial The Wolf Dog (1933), and received top-billing in Carnival Lady (1934) and The Big Race (1934). On radio she worked with James Cagney in productions for Lux Radio Theatre. She made her final film appearance in an uncredited role in the Laurel and Hardy film Swiss Miss (1938).

Personal life
Mallory was first married at the age of 16, and by 1933 had married her second husband, film producer William Cagney, brother of  actor James Cagney. She and William Cagney had two children, fraternal twins Jill and Stephan. She was married to actor Herbert Marshall from 1947 until her death from chronic throat disease at age 45 in Santa Monica, California, in 1958.

Though usually billed as Boots Mallory, she was sometimes billed as "Boots" Mallory, complete with quotation marks, and she used the quotation marks when signing autographs.

Filmography

Handle with Care (1932)
Humanity (1933)
Hello, Sister! (1933)
The Wolf Dog (1933)
Carnival Lady (1933)
The Big Race (1934)
Sing Sing Nights (1934)
Powdersmoke Range (1935)
Here's Flash Casey (1938)
Swiss Miss (1938) (uncredited)

References

External links

American film actresses
American female dancers
Dancers from Louisiana
American female models
Actresses from New Orleans
Actors from Mobile, Alabama
Actresses from Alabama
Vaudeville performers
1913 births
1958 deaths
20th-century American actresses
WAMPAS Baby Stars
20th-century American dancers